Hans Riso (16 March 1889 – 1950) was a German international footballer.

References

1889 births
1950 deaths
Date of death missing
Footballers from Leipzig
Association football goalkeepers
German footballers
Germany international footballers